Placido Gaslini was a male tennis player from Italy.

Biography
Gaslini, a Milanese lawyer and business man he was son of a banker, was a Davis Cup player and a tennis player, also playing the 1930 Wimbledon tournament. 

In 1926 he had a flirtation with the legendary tennis player Suzanne Lenglen.

See also
 Italy Davis Cup team

References

External links 
 

Date of birth missing
Date of death missing
Italian male tennis players
Tennis players from Milan
Businesspeople from Milan
Lawyers from Milan
Year of death missing